S.L. Benfica (Sport Lisboa e Benfica) is a  Portuguese multi-sport club, best known for its association football team.

S.L. Benfica may also refer to:
 S.L. Benfica B, the reserve team
 S.L. Benfica (youth), the youth academy
 S.L. Benfica (women's football)
 S.L. Benfica (futsal)
 S.L. Benfica (basketball)
 S.L. Benfica (roller hockey)
 S.L. Benfica (handball)
 S.L. Benfica (volleyball)
 S.L. Benfica (rugby union)
 S.L. Benfica (cycling team)
 S.L. Benfica (athletics)
 S.L. Benfica (beach soccer)
 S.L. Benfica (swimming)
 S.L. Benfica (archery)
 S.L. Benfica (table tennis)

Other football teams
 S.L. Benfica (Luanda)
 S.L. Benfica (Lubango)
 S.H. Benfica (Huambo)
 S.L. Benfica de Macau
 Sport London e Benfica F.C.

See also
 Benfica (disambiguation)